Sultan Mosque or Masjid Sultan is a mosque located at Muscat Street and North Bridge Road within the Kampong Glam precinct of the district of Rochor in Singapore. It was named after Sultan Hussain Shah. In 1975, it was designated a national monument.

Opening
The mosque was two-thirds complete and was formally opened on 27 December 1929. The mosque was fully completed in 1932.

The Sultan Mosque has stayed essentially unchanged since it was built, with only repairs carried out to the main hall in 1968 and an annex added in 1993. It was gazetted as a national monument on 8 March 1975.

The mosque is managed by its own board of trustees and management board.

Transportation
The mosque is accessible from Bugis MRT station and Jalan Besar MRT Station Station.

See also
 Islam in Singapore
 List of mosques in Singapore

Gallery

References

National Heritage Board (2002), Singapore's 100 Historic Places, Archipelago Press,

External links

Sultan Mosque Facebook Page
Sultan Mosque Instagram Page

Sultan
Tourist attractions in Singapore
National monuments of Singapore
Mosques completed in 1928
Rochor
20th-century architecture in Singapore